Roko Karanušić (born 5 September 1982) is retired Croatian professional tennis player. He turned pro in 2000, and his career-high ATP singles ranking is World No. 88, achieved in February 2009.

Performance timeline

Singles

ATP Challenger and ITF Futures finals

Singles: 24 (8–16)

Doubles: 9 (5–4)

References

External links
 
 
 
 Karanusic World ranking history

1982 births
Living people
Croatian male tennis players
Tennis players from Zagreb
21st-century Croatian people